Fabian Spiess (born 22 February 1994) is a German former professional footballer who played as a goalkeeper.

Career
Spiess joined the Notts County youth system in the 2010–11 season, and while still in the club's academy he signed for Isthmian League Premier Division side Lewes on loan in October 2011. He made his debut on 26 October in a Sussex Senior Challenge Cup 4–0 victory over Wick, before making his league bow in a 4–0 defeat of A.F.C. Hornchurch on 29 October. Having made three appearances for Lewes the loan came to an end in November after Spiess was injured in a training session with parent club County. He joined Corby Town of the Conference North on a youth loan on 1 March 2012. Spiess made his debut two days later in a 2–0 defeat away at Nuneaton Town and finished his loan at Corby with five appearances. His debut for County came as a 74th minute substitute for Stuart Nelson in the final day 4–1 victory at home to Colchester United on 5 May.

Spiess joined Bristol Rovers on an emergency loan on 5 December 2014 due to injuries to Steve Mildenhall and Will Puddy.

He moved to Nantwich Town in June 2017.

Personal life
Spiess completed a Masters in Sports Business Management from the University of Central Lancashire in 2019, going on to work with Athletes USA, a sport scholarship company.

Career statistics

Footnotes

A.  The "League" column constitutes appearances and goals in the Football League, Football Conference and Isthmian League.
B.  The "Other" column constitutes appearances and goals in Football League Trophy, Sussex Senior Challenge Cup and FA Trophy.

References

External links

1994 births
Living people
People from Wesel
Sportspeople from Düsseldorf (region)
German footballers
Association football goalkeepers
Notts County F.C. players
Lewes F.C. players
Corby Town F.C. players
Bristol Rovers F.C. players
Torquay United F.C. players
Alfreton Town F.C. players
Boston United F.C. players
Nantwich Town F.C. players
English Football League players
National League (English football) players
Isthmian League players
Northern Premier League players
German expatriate footballers
German expatriate sportspeople in England
Expatriate footballers in England
Footballers from North Rhine-Westphalia